is a Japanese football player currently playing for F.C. Tokyo.

National team career
In July 2012, Higashi was selected to the Japan U23 team for 2012 Summer Olympics. At this tournament, he wore the number 10 shirt for Japan and played all 6 matches. The team finished fourth.

Club statistics
Updated to 5 November 2022.

1Includes Emperor's Cup.
2Includes J. League Cup.
3Includes AFC Champions League.
3Includes Suruga Bank Championship.

National team statistics

Honours

Japan
Asian Games : 2010

Club
FC Tokyo
J.League Cup : 2020

References

External links

Profile at Omiya Ardija 
Profile at FC Tokyo
Keigo Higashi – Yahoo! Japan sports 

1990 births
Living people
Association football people from Fukuoka Prefecture
Japanese footballers
J1 League players
J2 League players
Oita Trinita players
Omiya Ardija players
FC Tokyo players
Olympic footballers of Japan
Footballers at the 2012 Summer Olympics
Asian Games medalists in football
Footballers at the 2010 Asian Games
Asian Games gold medalists for Japan
Association football midfielders
Medalists at the 2010 Asian Games